Alina Bronsky (a pseudonym), is a Russian-born German writer. Her books have been published in more than 15 countries, including the US and Italy,  in both print and audio formats. Her debut novel Scherbenpark (2008), or Broken Glass Park (2010), has received wide critical acclaim.

Life

Bronsky was born 1978 in Yekaterinburg, Soviet Russia, an industrial town at the foot of the Ural Mountains in central Russia, and spent her childhood in Marburg and Darmstadt. After dropping out of medical school, Bronsky worked as an advertising copywriter and in newspaper editing. Alina Bronsky is widowed and lives with her boyfriend, the actor Ulrich Noethen, in Berlin.  She has three children from her first marriage and, since August 2013, a daughter with Noethen. Bronsky has said that she sees herself as two separate people: the German-speaking self deals with her professional and occupational matters, while the Russian-speaking self deals with family and emotional matters. She established a pen name to facilitate this persona.

Major works

Alina Bronsky's works have been managed by the well-known Frankfurt literary agents Georg Simader, her current lector is Olaf Petersenn. By the time she had finished her first novel, she sent an email to three lecturers, of which all three subsequently requested the manuscript. Two of them finally agreed for a publication, which means a truly exceptional early recognition in these days.

The first written novel by Bronsky was Scherbenpark, also known as Broken Glass Park, telling a story about a seventeen-year-old girl named Sascha Naimann who struggles to adapt to her new life after the murder of her mother and moving from Russia to Germany. Sascha battles with the importance of taking care of her siblings and getting revenge on her mother's murderer. Bronsky's debut novel Broken Glass Park (Europa, 2010) was described by the Boston Globe as "a vivid description of contemporary adolescence under pressure." Broken Glass Park was nominated for the prestigious Ingeborg Bachmann Award in 2008  and for the German Young Adult Literary Prize in 2009. The novel was adapted into a movie starring Jasna Fritzi Bauer. The recognition gained from Bronsky's debut novel paved the way for her second novel.

Following the success of Broken Glass Park, Bronsky's The Hottest Dishes of the Tartar Cuisine (Europa, 2011) was long-listed for the German Book Prize in 2010, named a favorite read of 2011 by The Wall Street Journal and The Huffington Post, and was selected as one of Publishers Weekly'''s Ten Best Books of the Year. Described as "mordantly funny" by the San Francisco Chronicle, The Hottest Dishes of the Tartar Cuisine is the story of three unforgettable women whose destinies are tangled up in a family dynamic that is at turns hilarious and tragic. 
Alina Bronsky's third novel Just Call Me Superhero, which tells the story of a young man's complicated relationship with the members of a support group he has joined following an accident, was published by Europa Editions in the fall of 2014. The Boston Globe refers to it as "a story of redemption, and of learning, slowly, to be comfortable in one’s own skin."
Her young adult novels "Spiegelkind" and "Spiegelriss" belong to the mystery-adventure genre. As being part of a coming-of-age trilogy, the novels center the 15-year-old protagonist's dangerous search for her missing mother and the discovery of the world of the mysterious "Phees".

"Baba Dunja's Last Love", her most recent novel, follows the main character Baba Dunja through her experiences after returning from the nuclear disaster in Tschernobyl. Baba Dunja copes with her situation by writing letters to her daughter and spending her days in a peaceful and rural area, where she grows her own vegetables and engages in new social relationships.

Major themes
The characteristics of Bronsky's prose have led many critics to assign her to the literary group of the “Eastern turn” in German literature, succeeding what has sometimes been called “Turkish turn” – a literature distinctively concerned with "a vibrant, internationalized German literature gaining new impetus from reconnecting with its eastern neighbours after the divisions of the Cold War." Although migration experience and coming-of-age are not her only focus points, Bronsky is said to be part of this phenomenon, favouring the "double perspective, conditioned by their experiences of historical change in their old homelands and the search for identity in the new". Having experienced the residing life in a small, peripheral community, suffering from economic disadvantage, cultural displacement, and linguistic marginalization, herself, she admits to partially draw on her own experiences.

Literary style
Bronsky's writing has been described as imbued "with a gritty authenticity and unputdownable propulsion," and the Daily Beast'' calls her "an exciting new voice in the literary world."

However, due to her play with clichés and her characteristically clear and descriptive language used to form credible figures, some theorists introduced the accusation to be too easily consumable, to write in a rather pop-literary way. However, the German daily newspaper FAZ (Frankfurtrer Allgemeine Zeitung) praised her debut for the breathless “staccato”, the “Bronsky-Beat”, which pushes the reader through the plot, making the protagonist’ development so believable and psychologically conceivable despite the simple language, establishing a ruthless and shrewd portrait of the parallel world of repatriates settlement, of which yet was too little reported. In a similar manner, the German Book Award Jury justified its decision to nominee her for the German Book Award in 2008 because the first-person-narrator in Broken Glass Park tells typically irreverent for a teen, full of rage and humor, clever, cool, and heated at the same time. They praised her prose as “impressively clear and uncompromising, with dense images and a distant view of Sasha's fate". In doing so, Bronsky, according to the jury, demonstrates how the encounters with people of hypocrisy and forlornness contribute to finding one's own life. Many critics agree on her distinct presentation of  “strong characterizations”, going hand in hand with  “slowly unveiling plot twists”, which finally leads to the revealing of an “enigmatic conclusion that hints at the mystical”. She describes her own works as being concerned with what may be wrapped up as a study of a very typical sort of personal crisis, one of “leaving their secure home and going somewhere else. The same feelings which everybody knows - growing up, leaving your home, being alone, settling down, question of identity and love - they're all concentrated in immigration experience. And that's how I explain this phenomenon of interest.”. As most of her stories are set in Germany, her characters are partially described as doing “an exercise in solipsistic Weltschmerz”.

Awards/nominations
  Longlist German Book Award 2010: Die schärfsten Gerichte der tatarischen Küche
 Longlist German Book Award 2015: Baba Dunjas letzte Liebe 
 Nominated for the German Children's Literature Award  in 2009 (Category: Youth literature) 
 Nominated for the Aspekte-Literaturpreis in 2009 
  Broken Glass Park was nominated for the Ingeborg Bachmann Preis 2008 and an excerpt was read at the actual Wettbewerb um den Literaturpreis im Rahmen der Tage der deutschsprachigen Literatur

Works
 Scherbenpark. Roman, Kiepenheuer & Witsch, Köln 2008, . (Auch als Hörbuch)
 Broken Glass Park. Transl. by Tim Mohr. Europa Editions, New York. (March 30, 2010), 
 Die schärfsten Gerichte der tatarischen Küche. Roman, Kiepenheuer & Witsch, Köln 2010, 
 The Hottest Dishes of the Tartar Cuisine. Transl. by Tim Mohr. Europa Editions, New York. (April 26, 2011), 
 Spiegelkind. Jugendbuch, Arena Verlag, Würzburg 2012, 
 Just Call Me Superhero. Transl. by Tim Mohr. Europa Editions, New York. (November 4, 2014), 
 Baba Dunjas letzte Liebe. Köln : Kiepenheuer & Witsch, 2015, 1. Aufl.
 Und du kommst auch drin vor. Roman. dtv, München 2017, .
 Nenn mich einfach Superheld. Köln : Kiepenheuer & Witsch, 2015, 1. Aufl.
 Ditja zerkala: Moskva : Clever Izdat., 2014, Literaturno-chudožestvennoe izd.
 Just call me superhero. New York : Europa Ed., 2014
 Mein Bruder soll nicht Pepsi heißen. Frankfurt, M. : Hansisches Dr.- und Verl.-Haus, 2014
 Najljuća jela Tatarske kuhinje. Zagreb : Nakl. Ljevak, 2014.
 Outcast. Milano : Corbaccio, 2014.
 Rozbité zrcadlo. Praha : CooBoo, 2014, 1. vyd.        
 Sasja's wraak. Breda : Geus, 2014
 Scherbenpark. – Stuttgart : Klett Sprachen [Mehrteiliges Werk] Teil: [Hauptbd.]., 2014.
 Scherbenpark. Münster : Spaß-am-Lesen-Verl., 2014           
 Spiegelkind. Würzburg : Arena, 2014, 1. Aufl. als Sonderausg.        V
 Cam kırıkları parkı. Kadıköy, İstanbul : İthaki, 2013, 1. Baskı
 Spiegelriss. Würzburg : Arena, 2013, 1. Aufl.
 Cuisine tatare et descendance. Arles : Actes Sud, 2012, 1. éd.          
 De allerbeste oma van de wereld en de beste moeder, echtgenote, gastvrouw en mooiste vrouw óóit (volgens haarzelf). Breda : Geus, 2012
 I piatti più piccanti della cucina tatara. Roma : Ed. eo, 2011             
 Los platos más picantes de la cocina tártara. Madrid : Ed. Siruela, 2011       
 Nejostřejší pokrmy tatarské kuchyně. Bronsky, Alina. – Brno : Jota, 2011, Vyd.
 Park rozbitków. Torún : C & T, 2011, Wyd. 1           
 Parḳ ha-resisim. Or Yehudah : Kineret, 2011
 Sascha. Buenos Aires : Blatt & Rios, 2011   
 The hottest dishes of the Tartar cuisine. New York, NY : Europa Ed., 2011            
 Broken glass park. New York, NY : Europa Ed., 2010
 La vendetta di Sasha. Roma : Ed. eo, 2010

References 

German women writers
1978 births
Living people